Thomas Charles Hicks (born 28 August 1979) is an English cricketer. Hicks studied at St Catherine's College, Oxford and all of his first-class appearances as of the end of 2006 had come for Oxford University teams (Oxford University, Oxford Universities and Oxford UCCE), apart from one game for British Universities in 1999.

His two half-centuries have both come for Oxford against Cambridge University: the higher of these being the 58 he scored in 2001, adding 109 for the ninth wicket with opener Matthew Floyd to help set up a three-wicket victory. He also took 5–77 in the second innings of this game, second only to the 5-54 he claimed in Oxford's win over Northamptonshire in June 2000.

Hicks has played minor counties cricket for Dorset since 1998, and it was for them that he made his only List A appearance, against Glamorgan in the 2000 NatWest Trophy.

References

External links
 

1979 births
Living people
English cricketers
Oxford University cricketers
Dorset cricketers
People from Farnborough, London
British Universities cricketers
Dorset cricket captains
Alumni of St Catherine's College, Oxford
Oxford MCCU cricketers
Oxford Universities cricketers